India–Sweden relations are the bilateral ties between India and Sweden. Sweden recognised India's independence from the United Kingdom in 1947; both nations established formal diplomatic relations in 1949. India has an embassy in Stockholm, while Sweden has an embassy in New Delhi and honorary consulates in Chennai, Kolkata and Mumbai.

About 10,000 Indian citizens reside and work in Sweden, along with a further 9,000 persons of Indian origin; both groups are mainly employed in business or professional fields.

History

Early contacts
Contact between Sweden and the Indian subcontinent dates from at least the 8th century AD and the era of the Vikings. In 1954, a small bronze Buddha statuette was discovered during archaeological excavations of an 8th-century Viking ship on Helgö, Sweden; now on display at the Swedish History Museum, the statue is thought to have been made in present-day Kashmir around the 5th century AD In March 2015, PostNord Sverige released a postage stamp depicting the statue.

During the mid-18th century, the newly established Swedish East India Company attempted to gain a trading foothold in India through ports in Bengal and at Surat in Gujarat; though a few of the company's ventures in India were profitable, the already long-established competition from the rival British, French and Dutch East India companies soon forced Sweden to focus on trading with China.

Several Swedish firms established branches in India during the early 20th century, notably Ericsson, Swedish Match and ASEA (now part of the ABB Group). SKF established a small branch in Kolkata in 1923; after Indian independence, SKF India Ltd was incorporated in 1961, establishing a bearing factory in Pune, Maharashtra two years later.

Modern relations
Sweden recognised India as an independent nation in 1947, with both countries establishing formal diplomatic relations two years later. India set up a diplomatic mission in Stockholm in 1949 at the level of a legation, with the Indian head of mission holding the rank of an envoy extraordinary and minister plenipotentiary; in 1962, the mission was raised to the status of an embassy, with full ambassadorial rank. In 1957, Prime Minister Jawaharlal Nehru became the first Prime Minister of India to visit Sweden. Indira Gandhi, his daughter and successor as Prime Minister, attended the United Nations Conference on the Human Environment in Stockholm in 1972.

The Bofors scandal of 1987 damaged bilateral relations and led to the defeat of India's Congress Party in general elections two years later. The scandal was exposed by Swedish and Indian journalists; their investigations revealed that several officers of the noted Swedish armaments manufacturer Bofors, together with Swedish government officials, had paid large kickbacks to senior Indian politicians to secure the sale to India of 410 Haubits FH77 howitzers and related supplies.

Since the 2000s, the degree of bilateral ties has consistently increased, as has the frequency of bilateral visits. Both governments have expressed their eagerness to enhance their economic and cultural relations. Prime Minister of Sweden Stefan Löfven has declared his support for India's candidature as a permanent member of the United Nations Security Council.

Bilateral visits
The frequency of bilateral visits at the ministerial and parliamentary levels has increased in recent years. Four Indian Prime Ministers - Jawaharlal Nehru, Indira Gandhi, Rajiv Gandhi and Narendra Modi - have visited Sweden for official visits. Prime Minister of Sweden Göran Persson visited India in January 2004; Fredrik Reinfeldt visited India in November 2009 for the India-EU Summit and bilateral talks, while his successor Stefan Löfven visited Mumbai in February 2016 as leader of the Swedish delegation participating in the "Make In India" initiative. King Carl XVI Gustaf and Queen Silvia made a state visit to India in 1993, with the King leading a technology delegation to India in 2005. In June 2016, Pranab Mukherjee became the first President of India to make a state visit to Sweden.

Economic cooperation
Bilateral trade stands at over US$2 billion. After China and Japan, India is Sweden's third largest trade partner in Asia. The main Swedish exports to India are pharmaceuticals, paper & pulp products, chemicals, engineering products and telecom equipment; India's primary exports to Sweden are chemical products, food products and semi-manufactured and manufactured goods. Sweden's King Carl XVI Gustaf and Queen Silvia will go on a 5-day state visit to India on 2-5 December 2019 after a gap of 26 years. In this state visit, they will accompanied by the foreign minister Ann Linde, Minister of Enterprise Ibrahim Baylan and representatives of more than 50 Swedish organizations and business houses. Recent years have witnessed an increasing number of high-level visits between India and Sweden.

In June 2015, Pranab Mukherjee was the first Indian President in history to come to Sweden on a state visit. In February 2016, the Prime Minister of Sweden Stefan Löfven had visited India for the ‘Make in India’ industrial fair in Mumbai. In April 2018, India's Prime Minister Narendra Modi had traveled to Stockholm on a 2-day visit. Officially, in Sweden, these visits are being projected to promote Swedish export of goods and services, while in India, it is being told to attract Swedish investment for ‘Make in India

See also
Indians in Sweden

References

External links
Embassy of Sweden in India

 
Sweden
Bilateral relations of Sweden